Anillopsis is a genus of beetles in the family Carabidae, found in Africa. Anillopsis contains the following species:

 Anillopsis capensis (Peringuey, 1896)
 Anillopsis franzi Basilewsky, 1971

References

Trechinae